Întreprinderea de Construcții Aeronautice Românești (ICAR, also icar) (Romanian Aeronautical Design Enterprise), was a Romanian aircraft manufacturer. The company produced aircraft of its own design and under license.

History
Întreprinderea de Construcții Aeronautice Românești was founded in Bucharest in 1932 by Mihail Racovitd. In 1938, it was planned to rename the company Uzinele I.C.A.R. — Societate Anonimd and move it to Transylvania. However, this never occurred. ICAR closed in the early 1950s and production transitioned to the manufacture of industrial fans.

Aircraft

See also
Industria Aeronautică Română (IAR)
Societatea Pentru Exploatări Tehnice (SET)
Aviation in Romania

References

External links

Romanian Aviation Industry at globalsecurity.org
Old image with ICAR facilities at orizont aviatic

Vehicle manufacturing companies established in 1932
Defunct aircraft manufacturers of Romania
Greater Romania
1932 establishments in Romania
Vehicle manufacturing companies disestablished in 1951
1951 disestablishments in Romania
Companies based in Bucharest